Camptorrhiza is a genus of plants native to India and southern Africa. It contains two recognized species:

Camptorrhiza indica S.R.Yadav, N.P.Singh & B.Mathew - Maharashtra
Camptorrhiza strumosa (Baker) Oberm. - South Africa,  Angola, Mozambique, Zambia, Zimbabwe, Botswana, Namibia and the Caprivi Strip.  -  Type species for the genus

References

External links

Colchicaceae
Colchicaceae genera